The Alaska congressional election of 2000 was held on Tuesday, November 7, 2000. The term of the state's sole Representative to the United States House of Representatives expired on January 3, 2001. The winning candidate would serve a two-year term from January 3, 2001, to January 3, 2003. Alaska allows the political party to select the person who can appear for party primary. They are submitting a written notice with a copy of their cleared by-laws to the Director of Elections no later than September 1 of the year prior to the year in which a primary election is to be held.

Based on political party by-laws there are three ballots choices:

Alaska Democratic Party, Alaska Libertarian Party and Alaskan Independence party candidate with ballot measures—any registered voter can vote in this ballot

Alaska Republican Party candidate with ballot measures ballot—voters registered republican

Nonpartisan or Undeclared may vote this ballot and the ballot measures on the ballot—any registered voter may vote this ballot

General election

Results

References

Alaska
2000
House, U.S.